In the geometry of hyperbolic 3-space, the order-7 dodecahedral honeycomb a regular space-filling tessellation (or honeycomb).

Geometry
With Schläfli symbol {5,3,7}, it has seven dodecahedra {5,3} around each edge. All vertices are ultra-ideal (existing beyond the ideal boundary) with infinitely many dodecahedra existing around each vertex in an order-7 triangular tiling vertex arrangement.

Related polytopes and honeycombs 
It a part of a sequence of regular polytopes and honeycombs with dodecahedral cells, {5,3,p}.

It a part of a sequence of honeycombs {5,p,7}.

It a part of a sequence of honeycombs {p,3,7}.

Order-8 dodecahedral honeycomb

In the geometry of hyperbolic 3-space, the order-8 dodecahedral honeycomb a regular space-filling tessellation (or honeycomb). With Schläfli symbol {5,3,8}, it has eight dodecahedra {5,3} around each edge. All vertices are ultra-ideal (existing beyond the ideal boundary) with infinitely many dodecahedra existing around each vertex in an order-8 triangular tiling vertex arrangement.

It has a second construction as a uniform honeycomb, Schläfli symbol {5,(3,4,3)}, Coxeter diagram, with alternating types or colors of dodecahedral cells.

Infinite-order dodecahedral honeycomb

In the geometry of hyperbolic 3-space, the infinite-order dodecahedral honeycomb a regular space-filling tessellation (or honeycomb). With Schläfli symbol {5,3,∞}. It has infinitely many dodecahedra {5,3} around each edge. All vertices are ultra-ideal (existing beyond the ideal boundary) with infinitely many dodecahedra existing around each vertex in an infinite-order triangular tiling vertex arrangement.

It has a second construction as a uniform honeycomb, Schläfli symbol {5,(3,∞,3)}, Coxeter diagram, with alternating types or colors of dodecahedral cells.

See also 
 Convex uniform honeycombs in hyperbolic space
 List of regular polytopes
 Infinite-order hexagonal tiling honeycomb

References 

Coxeter, Regular Polytopes, 3rd. ed., Dover Publications, 1973. . (Tables I and II: Regular polytopes and honeycombs, pp. 294–296)
 The Beauty of Geometry: Twelve Essays (1999), Dover Publications,  (Chapter 10, Regular Honeycombs in Hyperbolic Space) Table III
 Jeffrey R. Weeks The Shape of Space, 2nd edition  (Chapters 16–17: Geometries on Three-manifolds I,II)
 George Maxwell, Sphere Packings and Hyperbolic Reflection Groups, JOURNAL OF ALGEBRA 79,78-97 (1982) 
 Hao Chen, Jean-Philippe Labbé, Lorentzian Coxeter groups and Boyd-Maxwell ball packings, (2013)
 Visualizing Hyperbolic Honeycombs arXiv:1511.02851 Roice Nelson, Henry Segerman (2015)

External links
John Baez, Visual insights: {7,3,3} Honeycomb (2014/08/01) {7,3,3} Honeycomb Meets Plane at Infinity (2014/08/14) 
 Danny Calegari, Kleinian, a tool for visualizing Kleinian groups, Geometry and the Imagination 4 March 2014. 
 {5,3,∞} Honeycomb in H^3 YouTube rotation of Poincare sphere

Honeycombs (geometry)
Infinite-order tilings